Sucia Island is located  north of Orcas Island in the San Juan Islands, San Juan County, Washington, United States. It is the largest of an archipelago of ten islands including Sucia Island, Little Sucia, Ewing, Justice, Herndon, the Cluster Islands islets, and several smaller, unnamed islands. Sucia island is roughly the shape of a hand. The total land area of all islands is 2.74 km² (1.058 sq mi, or 677 acres). The main island of Sucia Island by itself is 2.259 km² (0.8722 sq mi, or 558.1 ac). There was a permanent population of four persons as of the 2000 census, all on Sucia Island. Sucia Island State Park is a Washington State Marine Park.

History
Sucia Island's name originated with the Spanish Captain Francisco de Eliza, on his map of 1791. He named it "Isla Sucia". Sucia in Spanish means "dirty" or in a nautical sense "foul". This word was chosen because the shore was deemed dangerous due to reefs and hidden rocks.

These reefs and broken shorelines are from a geologic folding of the Earth's crust, which brought many interesting marine fossils to the surface. Some good examples can be found on the southeast arm of Sucia Island.

The isolated coves and bays of Sucia Island once served the Lummi Indians in their seal hunting days. They later provided excellent hideouts in the 19th century for smugglers of illegal Chinese laborers, as well as for hiding illegally imported wool and opium. Still later, the islands played a large role in rum-running during liquor Prohibition of the 1920s and 1930s, and in recent years they have figured in drug trafficking.

The cluster of Sucia Islands was purchased in 1960 by the Puget Sound Interclub Association and later donated to the State of Washington for protection as a Marine State Park.

In 2012, a femur bone from a theropod dinosaur informally named "Suciasaurus" was discovered on the island.

Activities

Camping
Birdwatching
Hiking
Rock Climbing
Kayaking
Fishing
Scuba diving
Crabbing
These activities can be accessed from Sucia Island State Park and the Echo Bay Campground.

Anchorages

Shallow Bay

Shallow Bay on the island's west side is protected from all but westerly winds and waves. There are seven mooring buoys and room for 40-50 small pleasure craft in this anchorage. There are beaches on three sides including a sandy beach to the north. Pebble Beach in the center is the access point to the camping and moorage pay box, as well as a large group camping site with a covered eating area and environmentally friendly composting out-houses. The anchor holding is good in sand but may be more rocky towards the center and mouth of the bay.

Echo Bay

Echo Bay is directly opposite the island's narrow isthmus from Shallow Bay and the largest of the anchorages, and the most exposed, particularly to southeast winds. There are a number of mooring buoys close to a pebble beach.

Fossil Bay

Fossil Bay is one of the most popular anchorages, particularly for small boats that prefer to tie up to one of two docks rather than anchor or pick up a mooring ring. Fossil Bay is an inlet that opens to the southeast.

Fox Cove
Fox Cove lies just west of and can be seen from Fossil Bay. Fox Cove is bordered by Ev Henry Finger point and Little Sucia island.

Ewing Cove
Ewing Cove is between the northeast end of Sucia island and Ewing Island. There is room for several boats at anchor or at a mooring buoy. The pebble beach at Ewing Cove is at the end of a  trail to the center of the island.

References

Notes

General references
Sucia Island group: Blocks 2000 thru 2005, Census Tract 9601, San Juan County, Washington United States Census Bureau

External links 

Sucia Island State Park | Washington State Parks and Recreation Commission
San Juan Islands Marine Parks, Maps and Pictures.
Image of sailor Davey at Fox Cove, Sucia Island, San Juans
Sucia - San Juan Islands, WA, boat trip video

 (archipelago)

San Juan Islands
Parks in San Juan County, Washington
State parks of Washington (state)